The Journal of Organizational Behavior is a peer-reviewed academic journal published eight times a year by Wiley-Blackwell. The journal publishes empirical reports and theoretical reviews spanning the spectrum of organizational behavior research. It was established in 1980 as the Journal of Occupational Behavior, obtaining its current title in 1988. The founding editor-in-chief was Cary Cooper (Manchester Business School), who was succeeded by Neal Ashkanasy (UQ Business School). The current editor-in-chief is Christian Resick (Drexel University).

Abstracting and indexing 
The journal is abstracted and indexed in the Social Sciences Citation Index, Scopus, ProQuest, Cambridge Scientific Abstracts, EBSCO databases, and Emerald Management Reviews. According to the Journal Citation Reports, it has a 2020 impact factor of 8.174.

Best dissertation-based paper 
The journal sponsors the Academy of Management's Organizational Behavior Division's annual "Best Dissertation-Based Paper" prize, which recognizes one paper, based on a dissertation, which makes a significant contribution to the OB discipline.

International Review of Industrial and Organizational Psychology 
In 2012, it was announced that the International Review of Industrial and Organizational Psychology would be published as an annual review issue of the Journal of Organizational Behavior. This issue will be co-edited by Gerard P. Hodgkinson (Warwick Business School) and J. Kevin Ford (Michigan State University).

See also
 Industrial and organizational psychology

References

External links 
 

Publications established in 1980
Business and management journals
English-language journals
Wiley (publisher) academic journals
Organizational psychology journals
8 times per year journals